The 1999–2000 Southeast Missouri State Redhawks men's basketball team represented Southeast Missouri State University in the 1999–2000 NCAA Division I men's basketball season. The Redhawks, led by fifth-year head coach Gary Garner, played their home games at the Show Me Center in Cape Girardeau, Missouri as members of the Ohio Valley Conference. They finished the season 24–7, 14–4 in OVC play to finish in second place. They won the OVC tournament to receive an automatic bid to the NCAA tournament. Southeast Missouri State was the No. 13 seed in the West region and they lost to LSU in the opening round. This was the only time the Redhawks had participated in the Men’s Division I NCAA Tournament until the 2022–23 season.

Roster

Schedule and results

|-
!colspan=12 style=| Regular season

|-
!colspan=12 style=| OVC Tournament

|-
!colspan=12 style=| NCAA Tournament

|-

Source

References

Southeast Missouri State Redhawks men's basketball seasons
Southeast Missouri State Redhawks
Southeast Missouri State
Southeast Missouri State Redhawks men's basketball
Southeast Missouri State Redhawks men's basketball